Maulina Novryliani (born 14 November 1987) is an Indonesian footballer who plays a midfielder for Asprov Banten and the Indonesia women's national team.

Club career
Novryliani has played for Asprov Banten in Indonesia.

International career 
Novryliani represented Indonesia at the 2022 AFC Women's Asian Cup.

International goals

References

External links

1987 births
Living people
People from Samarinda
Sportspeople from East Kalimantan
Indonesian women's footballers
Women's association football midfielders
Indonesia women's international footballers